The women's 5000 metres sprint competition of the athletics events at the 2015 Pan American Games took place on July 21 at the CIBC Pan Am and Parapan Am Athletics Stadium. The defending Pan American Games champion is Marisol Romero of Mexico.

Records
Prior to this competition, the existing world and Pan American Games records were as follows:

Qualification

Each National Olympic Committee (NOC) was able to enter up to two entrants providing they had met the minimum standard (16.43.00) in the qualifying period (January 1, 2014 to June 28, 2015).

Schedule

Results
All times shown are in seconds.

Final
Wind:

References

Athletics at the 2015 Pan American Games
2015
2015 in women's athletics